The 2021 Men's Asian Individual Squash Championships is the men's edition of the 2021 Asian Individual Squash Championships, which serves as the individual Asian championship for squash players. The event took place at Mushaf Squash Complex in Islamabad from 15 to 19 December 2021.

Seeds

  Ng Eain Yow (champion)
  Abdulla Al-Tamimi (second round)
  Tayyab Aslam (quarterfinals)
  Ivan Yuen (quarterfinals)
  Yip Tsz Fung (finals)
  Henry Leung (quarterfinals)
  Asim Khan (second round)
  Syed Azlan Amjad (second round)

  Lau Tsz Kwan (semifinals)
  Max Lee (second round)
  Nasir Iqbal (semifinals)
  Mohd Syafiq Kamal (quarterfinals)
  Addeen Idrakie (second round)
  Farhan Zaman (second round)
  Israr Ahmed (second round)
  Amaad Fareed (second round)

Draw and results

Finals

Top half

Section 1

Section 2

Bottom half

Section 3

Section 4

Source:
Seed: 
Draw: 
Results:

See also
2021 Women's Asian Individual Squash Championships
Asian Individual Squash Championships

References

2021 in squash
Squash in Asia
International sports competitions hosted by Pakistan
Squash tournaments in Pakistan
2021 in Pakistani sport